Notopleura madida is a species of flowering plant in the family Rubiaceae. It is endemic to Ecuador.

Palicoureeae
Endemic flora of Ecuador
Endangered plants